"Words" is a song written by Tommy Boyce and Bobby Hart and released by the Monkees. An early version by the Leaves appeared on their 1966 album Hey Joe. The Monkees first recorded the song for their second album, More of The Monkees, in August 1966 under the supervision of Boyce and Hart. While this version went unreleased until the 1990 compilation Missing Links Volume Two, it was featured in the 10 April 1967 episode of The Monkees "Monkees, Manhattan Style". A new version of the song was made to be the B-side of "Pleasant Valley Sunday" in 1967, now produced by Chip Douglas.

Micky Dolenz shared lead vocals with Peter Tork on both versions of the song. The B-side peaked at No. 11 on the Billboard Hot 100, marking the highest-charting single with Tork's lead.

The single version was included on the album Pisces, Aquarius, Capricorn & Jones Ltd., while the first version was later put on the 1990 compilation album Missing Links Volume Two.

Background 
On Pisces, Aquarius, Capricorn & Jones Ltd.'s liner notes, co-writer Tommy Boyce recalled that the song’s inspiration was a letter that he and Bobby Hart had received from a lonely girl that they invited to a hayride after an appearance on American Bandstand two weeks before. The letter stated "Tommy and Bobby, WORDS can never express how nice you two were to me at the hayride".

In contrast with the thankful tone of the letter, the song tells about the imminent break-up between the narrator and his girlfriend after discovering that she was a liar, that had always told him "words with lies inside".

Recording

First version 

The first version was recorded in the More of The Monkees sessions. At this time, the Monkees were merely actors adding their vocals to songs with backing tracks played by session musicians to The Monkees TV show. Monkee Micky Dolenz, had already sung lead in "Last Train to Clarksville" and most of their eponymous debut album, served as lead vocalist again in this song, accompanied by fellow member Peter Tork on the verses. The backing vocals were recorded by Dolenz, Tork, Davy Jones, Boyce, Hart and others.

Boyce and Hart were their producers and songwriters at the time and arranged a number of session musicians to play on the record, including Wayne Erwin on guitar (who also did backing vocals), Larry Taylor on bass and Billy Lewis on drums, also featuring a flute solo made by Ethmer Roten.

This version was aired during an episode of the first season of the series, "Monkees in Manhattan". In an episode part that shows a musical performance of the group, it features Jones (frontman) on drums, Tork (bassist) playing lead guitar, Michael Nesmith (guitarist) on bass and Dolenz (drummer) fronting the group.

Second version 
After they achieved their independence to record their own music, the Monkees re-recorded the song, now with the involvement of Monkees guitarist Nesmith and produced by Chip Douglas. The group now played on the record, with only the help of Douglas on bass and Eddie Hoh on drums.

There are few differences between the first and the second version, with the best noted being Peter Tork's Hammond organ's solo in place of Ethmer Roten's flute.

Release 
The song was released as the B-side of "Pleasant Valley Sunday" in 1967, that peaked at No. 3 on the Billboard Hot 100 charts. "Words" also charted on its own right, peaking at No. 11 in September 2. The single (second) version was used in rebroadcast of the episodes "Monkees in a Ghost Town" and "Monkees Chow Mein" in the first season of the Monkees TV show; then used in the second season episodes "Monkees in Texas" and "Monkees' Paw" while the original version was used in the episode "Monkees in Manhattan".

The single version was included on the album Pisces, Aquarius, Capricorn & Jones Ltd., while the first version was later put on the 1990 compilation album Missing Links Volume Two.

Chart performance

Personnel

First version 
 Micky Dolenz – lead and backing vocals
 Peter Tork – co-lead and backing vocals
 Davy Jones, Tommy Boyce, Bobby Hart, Ron Hicklin – backing vocals
 Wayne Erwin – guitar, backing vocals
 Gerry McGee, Louie Shelton – guitar
 Larry Taylor – bass guitar
 Billy Lewis – drums
 Norm Jeffries – percussion
 Ethmer Roten – flute

Second version 
 Micky Dolenz – lead vocals
 Peter Tork – co-lead vocals, Hammond B-3 Organ
 Michael Nesmith – tremolo electric guitar, percussion, backing vocals
 Davy Jones – chimes, backing vocals
 Chip Douglas – bass guitar
 Eddie Hoh – drums

References 

1966 songs
1967 songs
The Monkees songs
Songs written by Bobby Hart
Songs written by Tommy Boyce